The Zahediyeh Sufi Order was founded by Zahed Gilani of Lahijan. As a precursor to the Safaviyya tariqa, which was yet to culminate in the Safavid dynasty, the Zahediyeh Order and its murshid, Sheikh Zahed Gilani, holds a distinct place in the history of Iran.

The order traces its origins back to Zarrīn, one of the six Mangur (tribe) ancestral grandmothers, as well as Muhammad.

References

See also
 List of Sufi orders

Sufi orders
Zahediyeh Order